In advertising, an onsert is a separate advertisement put in a magazine, newspaper, or other publication.  Onserts are affixed to a page, and may be a sample of a product, a compact disk, magnet, a small booklet or even a targeted advertisement.

See also
Insert (advertising)

References

Advertising publications by format